The 2017–18 season is Club América's 5th consecutive season in the Liga MX, and 73rd consecutive season in the top-flight of Mexican football. The club will participate in the Liga MX, Copa MX, Supercopa MX, and the CONCACAF Champions League.

Squad

2017 Apertura squad

2018 Clausura squad

 

Sources:

Transfers

Summer 2017

In

Out

Winter

In

Out

Pre-season and friendlies

Competitions

Overview

Statistics

Goals

Assists

References

Club América seasons
2017–18 Liga MX season
America